Charles H. Baldwin House is a historic house on Bellevue Avenue  in Newport, Rhode Island, United States, that is part of the Bellevue Avenue Historic District, but is individually listed on the National Register of Historic Places (NRHP).

Description
The house is a -story wood-frame structure, finished on the exterior in brick, clapboards, and shingles. It was designed by William Appleton Potter and Robert Anderson and built in 1877–78, and is an excellent example of a transitional style between the Queen Anne and Shingle styles. The building features the asymmetrical and busy massing, with many gables, an extended porch with turned columns, and brick chimneys with decorative tops.  The house was built for United States Navy Admiral Charles H. Baldwin as a summer house.

The house was listed on the NRHP December 8, 1971.

See also

 National Register of Historic Places listings in Newport County, Rhode Island

References

External links

 
 

Houses in Newport, Rhode Island
Houses completed in 1877
Houses on the National Register of Historic Places in Rhode Island
Historic American Buildings Survey in Rhode Island
William Appleton Potter buildings
Shingle Style houses
Shingle Style architecture in Rhode Island
National Register of Historic Places in Newport, Rhode Island
Historic district contributing properties in Rhode Island
Queen Anne architecture in Rhode Island
1877 establishments in Rhode Island
Gilded Age mansions